On 29 August 2021, an unmanned drone attack by the United States killed 10 civilians in Kabul, Afghanistan, including 7 children. The U.S. initially said that the vehicle targeted in the strike had visited an IS safe house and that there had been a number secondary explosions, implying there had been explosives at the scene. Eyewitnesses and later independent investigations disproved this. Three weeks later the U.S. confirmed that the target of the strike was a Toyota Corolla carrying aid workers and that only civilians had been killed in the strike. No U.S. personnel faced disciplinary action for the attack.

Background

The attack occurred soon after the Fall of Kabul that led to the end of the War in Afghanistan that lasted from 2001 to 2021. In the days after the Fall of Kabul, mass civilian evacuations took place at Hamid Karzai International Airport. During these evacuations, the airport was attacked by a suicide bomber, which killed at least 183 people.

U.S. forces believed that subsequent attacks from ISIS were imminent, and through a series of erroneous intelligence decisions, linked a white 1996 Toyota Corolla and its driver, Zemari Ahmadi, to a terrorist plot. In actuality, Ahmadi was a worker for Nutrition and Education International, a California-based aid group.

Attack 
The day of the attack, Ahmadi ran errands for his employer including picking up a laptop and delivering water. When he stopped at a compound erroneously believed to be an ISIS safe house, six Reaper drones surrounded the compound. At 4:53 PM, a single Hellfire missile was launched, killing 7 children and 3 adults. The attack was conducted by the Over-the-Horizon (OTH) Strike Cell group of the U.S. Central Command. 

The United States military acknowledged its mistake after reviewing footage that showed three children coming to greet Ahmadi at his sedan before they were killed.

On 17 September 2021, General Kenneth McKenzie accepted responsibility for the killings.

On 15 October 2021, the Pentagon offered unspecified amounts of monetary compensation to the families of the victims as well as pledged help relocating to the United States. Condolence payments for deaths caused by the American military have varied widely in recent years; in fiscal year 2019 the Pentagon offered 71 such payments to victims in Afghanistan and Iraq ranging from $131 to $35,000.

On 13 December 2021, the Pentagon was again widely criticized after it stated that no U.S. personnel would face disciplinary action as a result of the drone strike. The decision was made by U.S. Secretary of Defense Lloyd Austin on the recommendation of two top military commanders.

On 20 January 2022, a group of 50 U.S. legislators submitted a letter to President Joe Biden, calling for a review of military practices. They stated that "in too many instances, U.S. drone strikes have instead led to unintended and deadly consequences – killing civilians and increasing anger towards the United States". The August 2021 Kabul drone strike was called "emblematic of this systemic failure that has persisted across decades and administrations".

On 27 January 2022, Secretary Austin addressed civilian casualties in drone strikes in a two-page directive in which he asked his department for a plan on the matter within 90 days.

References 

Articles containing video clips
August 2021 events in Afghanistan
Biden administration controversies
Civilian casualties in the War in Afghanistan (2001–2021)
Deaths by United States drone strikes in Afghanistan
History of the Islamic Republic of Afghanistan
Military operations of the War in Afghanistan (2001–2021) involving the United States
War in Afghanistan (2001–2021)
United States war crimes